Collegiality is the relationship between colleagues. A colleague is a fellow member of the same profession.

Colleagues are those explicitly united in a common purpose and respect each other's abilities to work toward that purpose. A colleague is an associate in a profession or in a civil or ecclesiastical office. In a narrower sense, members of the faculty of a university or college are each other's colleagues.

Sociologists of organizations use the word 'collegiality' in a technical sense, to create a contrast with the concept of bureaucracy. Classical authors such as Max Weber consider collegiality as an organizational device used by autocrats to prevent experts and professionals from challenging monocratic and sometimes arbitrary powers. More recently, authors such as Eliot Freidson (USA), Malcolm Waters (Australia), and Emmanuel Lazega (France) have said that collegiality can now be understood as a full-fledged organizational form.

In the Roman Republic

In the Roman Republic, collegiality was the practice of having at least two people in each magistracy in order to divide power among several people and check their powers, both to prevent the rise of another king and to ensure more productive magistrates. Examples of Roman collegiality include the two consuls and censors, six praetors, eight quaestors, four aediles, ten tribunes and decemviri.

Exceptions include extraordinary magistrates, dictators and the magister equitum.

In the Catholic Church

In the Roman Catholic Church, collegiality refers primarily to "the Pope governing the Church in collaboration with the bishops of the local Churches, respecting their proper autonomy." This had been the practice of the early Church and was revitalized by the Second Vatican Council. One of the major changes during the Second Vatican Council was the council's encouragement of bishops' conferences and the Pope's establishment of the Synod of Bishops.  From the beginning of his papacy, Pope Francis, who had twice been elected head of the Argentine Bishops' Conference, has advocated increasing the role of collegiality and synodality in the development of Church teachings.

See also 
 Collegium (ministry)
 Directorial system

Notes

References
 Gallagher, Clarence (2004). Collegiality in the East and the West in the First millennium. A Study Based on the Canonical Collections. The Jurist, 2004, 64(1), 64–81.
 Lorenzen, Michael (2006). Collegiality and the Academic Library. E-JASL: The Electronic Journal of Academic and Special Librarianship 7, no. 2 (Summer 2006).

External links

 Collegiality and the Academic Library

Roman law
Episcopacy in the Catholic Church